Edmund Kealoha Parker (March 19, 1931 – December 15, 1990) was an American martial artist, actor, senior grandmaster, and founder of American Kenpo Karate.

Life
Born in Hawaii, Parker began training in Judo at an early age and later studied boxing. During the 1940s, Parker was introduced to Kenpō by Frank Chow, who then introduced Parker to William Chow, a student of James Mitose. Parker trained with William Chow while serving in the Coast Guard and attending Brigham Young University, and in 1953 he was promoted to the rank of black belt. Parker, seeing that modern times posed new situations that were not addressed in Kenpo, adapted the art to make it more easily applicable to the streets of America. He called his adapted style American Kenpo Karate.

Success and students
Parker opened the first karate school in the western United States in Provo, Utah, in 1954.  By 1956, Parker opened a dojo in Pasadena, California. Ed Parker's first ever black-belt was James Ibrao. His first brown-belt student was Charles Beeder. There is controversy over whether Beeder received the first black belt awarded by Parker. Beeder's son has stated for the record that his father's black belt came after Ed Parker had moved to California.  The other black belts in chronological order up to 1962 were Ben Otaké; Rich Montgomery; Mills Crenshaw, whom Parker authorized to open a school in Salt Lake City, Utah, in late 1958 (which later became the birthplace of the International Kenpo Karate Association, or IKKA); Tom Garriga; Rick Flores; Al and Jim Tracy of Tracy Kenpo; Chuck Sullivan; Mark Georgantas; John McSweeney; and Dave Hebler.  In 1962, John McSweeney opened a school in Ireland, which prompted Parker to give control of the Kenpo Karate Association of America to the Tracy Brothers and form a new organization: the International Kenpo Karate Association.

Parker was well known for his business creativity and helped many martial artists open their own dojos. He was well known in Hollywood, where he trained several stunt men and celebrities—most notably Elvis Presley, to whom he eventually awarded a first-degree black belt in Kenpo. He left behind a few world-renowned grand masters: Bob White; Richard "Huk" Planas; Larry Tatum; Ron Chapel; and Frank Trejo, who ran a school in California prior to his death. Parker helped Bruce Lee gain national attention by introducing him at his International Karate Championships. He served as one of Elvis Presley's bodyguards during the singer's final years. He is best known to Kenpoists as the founder of American Kenpo and is referred to fondly as the "Father of American Kenpo."  He is formally referred to as Senior Grand Master of American Kenpo.

Hollywood career
Parker had a minor career as a Hollywood actor and stunt man. His most notable film was Kill the Golden Goose.  In this film, he co-stars with Hapkido master Bong Soo Han. He also played himself (as a mercenary) in the 1979 action film Seven, opposite William Smith. His other acting work included the (uncredited) role of Mr. Chong in  Blake Edwards' Revenge of the Pink Panther and again in Curse of the Pink Panther. He was one of the instructors of martial arts action-movie star Jeff Speakman, and Parker assisted with the fight choreography of Speakman's film The Perfect Weapon, which was released in 1991, shortly after Parker's death.

Parker can be seen with Elvis Presley in the opening sequence of the 1977 TV special "Elvis in Concert". Parker wrote a book about his time with Elvis on the road.

Parker's training
Ed Parker was enrolled in Judo classes by his father at the age of twelve, and Parker received his Shodan in Judo in 1949 at the age of eighteen.  After receiving his brown belt in Kenpo, he moved to the US mainland to attend Brigham Young University, where he began to teach martial arts. Mr. Parker's kenpo shodan diploma is dated 1953.

During this period, Parker was significantly influenced by the Japanese and Okinawan interpretations prevalent in Hawaii. Parker's book Kenpo Karate, published in 1961, shows the many hard linear movements, albeit with modifications, that set his interpretations apart.

All the influences up to that time were reflected in Parker's rigid, linear method of "Kenpo Karate," as it was called. Between writing and publishing, however, he began to be influenced by the Chinese arts, and included this information in his system. He settled in Southern California after leaving the Coast Guard and finishing his education at BYU. Here he found himself surrounded by other martial artists from a wide variety of systems, many of whom were willing to discuss and share their arts with him. Parker made contact with people like Ark Wong, Haumea Lefiti, Jimmy Wing Woo (who developed many of the American Kenpo forms still used today), Jimmy H.Woo (Chin Siu Dek), founder and Grandmaster of Kung Fu San Soo (Tsoi Li Ho Fut) and Lau Bun. These martial artists were known for their skills in arts such as Five Family Fist Kung Fu, Splashing-Hands, San Soo, T'ai Chi, and Hung Gar, and this influence remains visible in both historical material (such as forms that Parker taught in his system) and current principles.

Exposed to new Chinese training concepts and history, he wrote a second book, Secrets of Chinese Karate, published in 1963. Parker drew comparisons in this and other books between karate (a better known art in the United States at that time) and the Chinese methods he adopted and taught.

Death
Ed Parker, the owner of an international chain of karate schools, died of a heart attack on Saturday, 15 December 1990 after arriving at Honolulu International Airport. He was 59 years old.

Bibliography
 1960, Kenpo Karate: Law of the Fist and the Empty Hand. Delsby Publications 
 1963, Secrets of Chinese Karate. Prentice-Hall 
 1975, Ed Parker's Guide to the Nunchaku 
 1975, Ed Parker's Kenpo Karate Accumulative Journal. International Kenpo Karate Association.
 1978, Inside Elvis. Rampart House 
 1982, Ed Parker's Infinite Insights into Kenpo, Vol. 1: Mental Stimulation. Delsby Publications 
 1983, Ed Parker's Infinite Insights into Kenpo, Vol. 2: Physical Analyzation I. Delsby Publications 
 1985, Ed Parker's Infinite Insights into Kenpo, Vol. 3: Physical Analyzation II. Delsby Publications 
 1986, Ed Parker's Infinite Insights Into Kenpo, Vol. 4: Mental and Physical Constituents. Delsby Publications 
 1987, Ed Parker's Infinite Insights Into Kenpo: Vol. 5: Mental and Physical Applications. Delsby Publications 
 1988, The Woman's Guide to Self Defense
 1988, The Zen of Kenpo. Delsby Publications 
 1992, Ed Parker's Encyclopedia of Kenpo. Delsby Publications

Filmography

TV

References

Further reading
 Parker, L. (1997). Memories of Ed Parker: Sr. Grandmaster of American Kenpo Karate. Delsby Publications. .

External links

1931 births
1990 deaths
20th-century American male actors
American male karateka
American Kenpo practitioners
Latter Day Saints from Hawaii
Brigham Young University alumni
Martial arts school founders
Elvis Presley